The Paul Wild Observatory, also known as the Narrabri Observatory and Culgoora Observatory, is an astronomical research facility located about 24 km west of Narrabri, New South Wales, Australia. It is the home of the Australia Telescope Compact Array, and the Culgoora Solar Observatory.

The site itself and the Australia Telescope Compact Array are run by Australia's science agency, the CSIRO. The current Solar Observatory is run by the Space Weather Services section of Australia's Bureau of Meteorology.

The site is named in honour of Australian radio astronomer Paul Wild, who headed the team that built the instrument that the site was established for – the Culgoora Radioheliograph, the world's first radioheliograph – which ran from 1967 to 1984.

The Australia Telescope Compact Array began operating at the site in 1988.

Current facilities 
 The Australia Telescope Compact Array – a six-dish radio telescope interferometer
 The Ionospheric Prediction Service (Space Weather Services) Culgoora Solar Observatory
 A node of the Birmingham Solar Oscillations Network (BiSON)
An element of the Magnetic Data Acquisition System (MAGDAS) global magnetometer array

Past facilities 
 The Culgoora Radioheliograph
The CSIRO Culgoora Solar Observatory
The Sydney University Stellar Interferometer (SUSI)

In the media 
The children's/teen's television adventure series Sky Trackers was filmed at the site in 1993, with the antenna dishes of the Australia Telescope Compact Array being prominently featured.

Other sites nearby 
In addition to the Paul Wild Observatory, there is a history of astronomical research at other sites in the Narrabri area. The Narrabri Stellar Intensity Interferometer (NSII), the predecessor of SUSI, was located about 10 km north of Narrabri.

At a site south of Narrabri, near the Bohena Creek, Durham University ran gamma ray telescopes from 1986 to 2000. The Bohena Creek site had previously been used for Sydney University's Giant Air Shower Recorder (SUGAR) for the detection of cosmic rays.

See also
 List of radio telescopes

References

External links 
 Narrabri Observatory Public Information (CSIRO)
 Australia Telescope Compact Array - Fast Facts (CSIRO)
 Space Weather Services (IPS) Culgoora Solar Observatory (Australian Bureau of Meteorology)
 Birmingham Solar Oscillations Network (University of Birmingham)
 MAGDAS (Kyushu University)
Paul Wild (1923-2008) (CSIROpedia)
"A New Look at the Sun", a CSIRO film on the Culgoora Radioheliograph (CSIROpedia)
"The Sun – Our Nearest Star", a CSIRO film on the CSIRO Culgoora Solar Observatory (CSIROpedia)

Astronomical observatories in New South Wales
Radio observatories
North West Slopes